Southern Maalhosmadulu Atoll (code name Baa) is an administrative division of the Maldives. It consists of two separate natural atolls, namely the southern part of Maalhosmadulhu Atoll (which is 42 km long and 32 km wide and consists of 10 inhabited islands) and the smaller natural atoll known as Goifulhafehendhu Atoll (Horsburgh Atoll in the Admiralty charts). 
Situated on the west of the Maldives atoll chain, it consists of 75 islands of which 13 are inhabited with a population of over 11,000 people. The remaining 57 islands are uninhabited, in addition to five islands being developed as resorts.
Thulhaadhoo Island is traditionally well known for its lacquerwork handicrafts.

Ecology

Maalhosmadulhu Atoll  is also considered as a good example of the rich biodiversity found in the Maldives, including large mangroves and a unique diversity of fauna, such as the benthic fauna. Furthermore, the ring-shaped reef forms known as faru in the local language is a reef structure which is unique to the Maldives.

The southernmost uninhabited island of Olhugiri in the Baa atoll lies 13 km north of Goifulhafehendhu Atoll. Olhugiri is well known for its unique natural vegetation and for providing two of the only perching sites for the great frigatebird in the Maldives. Likewise, other marine creatures such as seaturtles and hawksbill turtles can be encountered.

The Fisheries Ministry of the Maldives has banned catching turtles or taking eggs from Olhugiri, which also applies to 11 other islands.

See also
Reethi Beach Tourist Resort

References
 Divehi Tārīkhah Au Alikameh. Divehi Bahāi Tārikhah Khidmaiykurā Qaumī Markazu. Reprint 1958 edn. Malé 1990.
 Divehiraajjege Jōgrafīge Vanavaru. Muhammadu Ibrahim Lutfee. G.Sōsanī.
 Xavier Romero-Frias. The Maldive Islanders, A Study of the Popular Culture of an Ancient Ocean Kingdom. Barcelona 1999.

External links
 http://www.baa.gov.mv
 News report on banning the capturing of turtles
 Facts and figures about Baa Atoll

Atolls of the Maldives

dv:މާޅޮސްމަޑުލު ދެކުނުބުރި